Wolves of the Desert is a 1926 American silent Western film directed by Ben F. Wilson and starring Neva Gerber, Ruth Royce and Ashton Dearholt.

Cast
 Neva Gerber
 Ruth Royce
 Ashton Dearholt
 Al Ferguson
 Ed La Niece
 Ben F. Wilson

References

Bibliography
 Langman, Larry. A Guide to Silent Westerns. Greenwood Publishing Group, 1992.

External links
 

1926 films
1926 Western (genre) films
1920s English-language films
Films directed by Ben F. Wilson
Rayart Pictures films
Silent American Western (genre) films
1920s American films